Jake Barrett (born 8 November 1995) is a former professional Australian rules footballer who played for the  Greater Western Sydney Giants and the Brisbane Lions in the Australian Football League (AFL).

Barrett, originally from Temora, is the first cousin of Hawthorn premiership player Luke Breust and the second cousin of former Dally M winner Trent Barrett. He was picked up as a NSW zone selection by the GWS Giants on the back of a strong AFL Under 18 Championships and excellent results at the 2013 AFL draft combine where he finished second in the beep test reaching level 15.6 as well as a top 10 result in the 20-metre sprint. At the conclusion of the 2016 season, he was delisted by Greater Western Sydney. He was subsequently drafted by the Brisbane Lions in the 2017 rookie draft. However he was subsequently delisted by them as well the following season.

References

External links

 

1995 births
Living people
NSW/ACT Rams players
Australian rules footballers from New South Wales
Greater Western Sydney Giants players
Brisbane Lions players